words is a standard file on Unix and Unix-like operating systems, and is simply a newline-delimited list of dictionary words. It is used, for instance, by spell-checking programs.

On Fedora and Arch Linux, the  file is provided by the  package. The  package is sourced from data from the Moby Project, a public domain compilation of words.

References

External links
 Sample words file from Duke CS department

Unix
Unix software